The 1993 Daily Mirror/Sporting Life Greyhound Derby took place during May and June with the final being held on 26 June 1993 at Wimbledon Stadium.  The winner Ringa Hustle received £40,000. The competition was sponsored by the Sporting Life and Daily Mirror.

Final result 
At Wimbledon (over 480 metres):

Distances 
2¼, 2, neck, neck, ¾ (lengths)
The distances between the greyhounds are in finishing order and shown in lengths. One length is equal to 0.08 of one second.

Semi finals

Competition Report
Four greyhounds topped the ante-post lists at 25-1, they were Daleys Denis, Murlens Abbey, Manx Treasure and Skip Pass.

Hypnotic Stag, Daleys Denis and Ringa Hustle all won early heats, the latter recording 28.91 but in round two Tony Meek's Ringa Hustle was beaten by younger kennelmate Lassa Java. In the third round Lassa Java won in a fast 28.64 and I'm His recorded 28.72. The quarter-finals set up a repeat meeting between Ringa Hustle and Lassa Java and this time Ringa Hustle came out the winner but Greenane Squire set the fastest time of the competition so far in another quarter when beating Pall Mall Stakes champion Sullane Castle by over six lengths in 28.50 sec.

The semi-finals drew both Tony Meek greyhounds against each other yet again but this time Ringa Hustle won comfortably in 28.67. In the second semi Greenane Squire recorded 28.82 from Sullane Castle and Ceader Mountain; favourite I'm His went out.

By virtue of his latest two wins Greenane Squire was to be sent off 15-8 favourite in the final but it was the first time that he was to meet Ringa Hustle during the competition. Ringa Hustle broke well from trap three and led all of the way. Greenane Squire was impeded slightly at the first bend with Sullane Castle and could not get on terms with Ringa Hustle. Sullane Castle ran on strongly to take the runners up spot.

See also
1993 UK & Ireland Greyhound Racing Year

References

Greyhound Derby
English Greyhound Derby